Hoplerythrinus gronovii is a species of trahira (family Erythrinidae). It is a tropical, pelagic freshwater fish.

The fish is named in honor of the Dutch naturalist Laurens Theodorus Gronovius (who was also known as Gronow, 1730-1777), who apparently illustrated this species in his book Museum ichthyologicum (1754-1756).

References

Erythrinidae
Taxa named by Achille Valenciennes
Fish described in 1847